Bang Min-ah (born May 13, 1993), better known by the mononym Minah, is a South Korean singer and actress. She debuted as a member of the girl group Girl's Day in 2010 and released her first solo album, I Am a Woman Too, in 2015. She has acted in various films and television series, including lead roles in Beautiful Gong Shim (2016) and My Absolute Boyfriend (2019).

Early life 
Bang Min-ah was born on May 13, 1993, in Incheon, South Korea. She attended Jinsun Girls' High School and majored in Broadcasting at Dongduk Women's University.

Music career

Girl's Day 

On July 9, 2010, Minah made her debut as a member of girl group Girl's Day on Music Bank with their first single "Tilt My Head."

Solo career
Minah has released several solo singles; among them are "Holding Hands," a song on Lee Hyun-do's project album 4U; and "You, I" for the soundtrack of the SBS drama Doctor Stranger.

On March 3, 2015, DreamT announced that Minah would be making her solo debut in mid-March. Minah released her album I Am a Woman Too on March 15, 2015.

Minah released a solo digital single "Other Way" on November 11, 2017. Minah took part in writing the lyrics to the song "11°", and also took part in composing the song.

On August 28, 2022, Minah made a comeback with her single 'Listen to me Once.'

Acting career 
Minah made her acting debut on the tvN variety show, Roller Coaster, appearing in the segment "Frustrated, But Let's Stick Together." She then featured in the sitcom Vampire Idol in 2011.

In 2013, Minah made her film debut in Holly, playing a high school student who aspires to be a ballerina. She received the Rookie Actress Award at the Gwangju International Film Festival for her performance. The same year, Minah became the host of the music program Inkigayo, which she left in January 2014. She was subsequently cast in her second film, the family comedy Dad for Rent.

In 2015, Minah featured in the family drama Sweet, Savage Family. She also starred alongside Seo Kang-joon as leads for The Best Future, a web drama produced by Samsung.

In 2016, Minah landed her first television leading role in SBS's romantic comedy series Beautiful Gong Shim. She earned positive reviews for her portrayal of the "ugly" but down-to-earth protagonist.

In 2019, Minah returned to the small screen with the romantic comedy drama My Absolute Boyfriend, based on the Japanese manga series of the same name.

Discography

Extended plays

Singles

Other charted songs

Soundtrack appearances

Filmography

Films

Television series

Television show

Hosting

Ambassadorship 
Public Relations Ambassador for the 24th Seoul International Women's Film Festival (2022)

Awards and nominations

References

External links 

 

1993 births
Living people
Actresses from Seoul
Dongduk Women's University alumni
Girl's Day members
K-pop singers
Singers from Seoul
South Korean dance musicians
South Korean female dancers
South Korean film actresses
South Korean female idols
South Korean women pop singers
South Korean television actresses
South Korean television personalities
Onyang Bang clan